Velo Veronese is a comune (municipality) in the Province of Verona in the Italian region Veneto, located about  west of Venice and about  northeast of Verona. It is part of the Thirteen Communities, a group of communities which historically speak the Cimbrian language.

Velo Veronese borders the following municipalities: Badia Calavena, Roverè Veronese, San Mauro di Saline, and Selva di Progno.

References

External links
 Official website

Cities and towns in Veneto